Floyd Haskell "Jack" Farmer (July 14, 1892 – May 21, 1970) was a Major League Baseball second baseman who played for two seasons. He played for the Pittsburgh Pirates in 1916 and the Cleveland Indians in 1918. He attended Cumberland University in Lebanon, Tennessee.

External links

1892 births
1970 deaths
Major League Baseball second basemen
Pittsburgh Pirates players
Cleveland Indians players
Selma River Rats players
Nashville Vols players
Louisville Colonels (minor league) players
Portland Beavers players
Salt Lake City Bees players
People from Jackson County, Tennessee
People from Columbia, Louisiana